The 2020–21 KNVB Cup, for sponsoring reasons officially called the TOTO KNVB Beker, was the 103rd season of the annual Dutch national football cup competition. It commenced on 29 August 2020 with the first of two preliminary rounds, and concluded on 18 April 2021 with the final played at De Kuip in Rotterdam.

Ajax were the defending champions as the winners of the 2019 final, with the 2020 final cancelled due to the COVID-19 pandemic in the Netherlands. Ajax went on to successfully defend their title after defeating Vitesse 2–1 in the final.

As winners, Ajax would participate in the 2021 Johan Cruyff Shield against the 2020–21 Eredivisie champions.

Effects of the COVID-19 pandemic 
Due to the COVID-19 pandemic, all six district cups were abandoned, before any of them had reached the semi-finals. This meant that none of the 24 qualifiers from the Hoofdklasse and lower were known at the time of the abandonment. The KNVB decided through a scheme which four teams would qualify per district. The same scheme is also used when a team reaches the semi-finals of the district cup but wins promotion to the Derde Divisie in the same season (and by that qualifying in two ways for the KNVB Cup)

On 14 October 2020, the KNVB announced that all first round matches involving amateur teams would be postponed until 1 and 2 December as a result of new measures taken by the government to stop the spread of the virus. If the amateur teams are still not allowed to play matches by 2 December they will be excluded from further participation. On 17 November 2020, the KNVB's director of amateur football Jan Dirk van der Zee confirmed that the KNVB Cup would continue without the amateur teams.

Schedule

Matches

Preliminary rounds 
The draw for the first two preliminary rounds was performed on 23 July 2020 at 19:00 CEST, and was broadcast live on YouTube. The draw was conducted by Martijn van Oers, player of DWOW, the lowest ranked club that qualified for the Cup this season.

First preliminary round 
60 amateur teams qualified for this stage: 24 teams which qualified through the 2019–20 district cup tournaments and 36 teams from the 2020–21 Derde Divisie. The draw was performed on 23 July 2020.

Second preliminary round 
In the second preliminary round, 14 teams from the Tweede Divisie enter the tournament, as the two teams that won a period title in the 2019–20 season (IJsselmeervogels and VV Katwijk) got a bye to the first round.

Since last season, teams who qualify for the group stage of the UEFA Champions League and the UEFA Europa League get a bye to the second round, leaving empty spots in the first round. However, as this season the draw for the second preliminary round was made before the end of the qualifying rounds and play-off rounds of both European competitions, it was not known yet how many Dutch clubs reached the group stage of both competitions. At the time of the draw, only Ajax and Feyenoord were assured of that, so the winners of match 27 in the first preliminary round (who turned out to be Quick) and SV TEC were drawn a bye to compensate.

The Royal Dutch Football Association solved the rest of the puzzle by hold a worst-case-scenario into account, therefore the last three matches drawn are subject of the performances of AZ, PSV and Willem II in the qualifying rounds of the 2020–21 UEFA Champions League and the 2020–21 UEFA Europa League. If all three of them qualify for the group stage, then all matches will be played as normal. If one of them fail to qualify, match 21 will not be played. If two of them fail to qualify, match 20 will also not be played, and if all three teams fail to qualify, match 19 will not be played as well. All the teams of the matches that will not be played will be given byes to the first round.

AZ won their match in the second qualifying round (League Route) of the Champions League on 26 August, assuring the Europa League group stage at worst in the process. This simultaneously assured match 19 in the second preliminary round to go ahead and placed AZ in the second round instead of the first round.

Main tournament

First round

Second round

Round of 16 
On 18 November 2020, the KNVB announced that 9 teams which had qualified for the second round would be getting a bye to the round of 16, with the other 14 teams playing against another team for one of the other 7 spots in the round of 16.

Quarter-finals
On 19 December 2020, the KNVB already performed a draw to determine which teams would be playing at home in the quarter-finals for organizational reasons. The second half of the draw was performed on 23 January 2021.

Semi-finals
On 23 January 2021, the KNVB performed a draw to determine which teams would be playing at home in the semi-finals for organizational reasons. The second half of the draw was performed on 13 February 2021.

Final

Notes

References

External links

Netherlands
KNVB Cup
KNVB Cup seasons